Dexterville is a hamlet in the town of Granby, Oswego County, New York, United States.

Notes

Hamlets in Oswego County, New York
Hamlets in New York (state)